Jackals is a horror novel and thriller novel by Charles L. Grant. It was first published in 1994 by Forge Books in the United States and in the UK by New English Library. Jackals is the author's final stand-alone novel before his death in 2006. Grant continued to write novels in various series - and genres - and short stories for anthologies. Stephen King said of Jackals: '[t]he premier horror writer of his or any generation'.

Plot
Locals from a small town cruise the rural back roads in order to prey on solitary drivers.

References

1994 American novels
American horror novels
Novels set in Connecticut
Forge Books books
New English Library books